Ed Corbin is an American actor who is best known for his supporting roles in such films as To Protect and Serve (2001), Chrystal (2004), Trailer Park of Terror (2008) and True Grit (2010).

Early life
Corbin attended Armuchee High School in Rome, Georgia and worked as a pulpwooder in his family business while in high school. He graduated from the University of Georgia with honors, Finance 87.

Acting career
Corbin made his film debut as a patient to Danny Nelson's "Jake Pruitt" character in Tucker Johnston's Blood Salvage (1990). The film launched Corbin's career as a supporting actor which followed with such films as Midnight Edition (1993), Blue Sky (1994), In the Flesh (1998), and Barstow 2008 (2001). In addition to his film roles, Corbin also appeared on such television shows as The X-Files ("Trevor", 1999) as a correctional officer, The Amanda Show (two episodes, 2000–01), on which he played a fictional character called "The Boost" on a commercial parody of the same name, and a role children best remember him by, The Bold and the Beautiful (1987–present) as a bouncer, and Becker (one episode, 2001) as a cell mate.

Personal life
Corbin currently resides in Los Angeles, Canoga Park neighborhood, California.

Filmography
Blood Salvage (1990) - Jake's Patient
Midnight Edition (1993) - Man in Hardware Store
Blue Sky (1994) - Stockade MP
Vicious Kiss (1995) - Thug #2
In the Flesh (1998) - Philip Kirsch
The Real Reason (Men Commit Crimes) (1998) - Marty
Barstow 2008 (2001) - Tree Williams
To Protect and Serve (2001) - Officer Holloway
Chrystal (2004) - Ned
Trailer Park of Terror (2008) - Sgt. Stank
True Grit (2010) - Bear Man
The Congress (2013) - Charlie (uncredited)
Altergeist (2014) - Henry Blaine
Atlas Shrugged (2014) - Lineman
Faces (2014-2015, TV Series) - Ned Mason
K.C. Undercover (2015, TV Series) - Traffic Cop
Abidig (2021) - Vincent D.E.A

 Amos Moses Music Video with Jerry Reed

References

External links

American male film actors
American male television actors
Living people
Male actors from Georgia (U.S. state)
1963 births
People from Rome, Georgia
University of Georgia alumni